The FIL European Luge Natural Track Championships 2010 was held 15–17 January 2010 in Sankt Sebastian, Austria. A team event debuted at these championships, the first change to the FIL European Luge Natural Track Championships since they began in 1970. Italy earned their 100th medal at these championships.

Men's singles

16 January 2010 following women's run 2. 17 January 2010 at 09:30 CET (run 2) and 12:00 CET. Pigneter won his first gold medal in this event after two straight bronzes. He also won his second gold and third medal at these championships with the fastest time in all three runs.

Women's singles

16 January 2010 following doubles run 1. Run 2 at 12:00 CET same day. 17 January 2010 at 11:00 CET. Gietl led after the first run while Lanthaler had the fastest second and third runs, but it was not enough to catch Lavrentyeva, who won her second straight championships and third overall. Lanthaler earned her first medal in the championships while Gietl won her third straight bronze.

Men's doubles

First run on 16 January 2010 at 09:30 CET. Second run on 11:30 CET same day. Pigneter and Clara won their first European title by having the fastest times in both runs. Three-time defending World Champions Pavel Porzhnev and Ivan Lazarev of Russia finished sixth.

Mixed team

15 January 2010 at 18:30 CET. Points were awarded rather than by time.

Medal table

References

2009-10 FIL-Luge Natural track calendar, including St. Sebatien's championship dates - accessed 22 November 2009.
Men's doubles natural track European champions
Men's singles natural track European champions
Women's singles natural track European champions

2010 in Austrian sport
FIL European Luge Natural Track Championships
International sports competitions hosted by Austria
2010 in luge
2010 in European sport
Luge in Austria